Kurash was a demonstration sport at the 2007 Asian Indoor Games was held in IPM Multisport Pavilion, Macau, China on 2 November 2007.

Medalists

Men

Women

Medal table

Results

Men

73 kg
2 November

+81 kg
2 November

Women

63 kg
2 November

+78 kg
2 November

References
 Results
 IKA

2007 Asian Indoor Games events
2007